Lake Tytyl (Ozero Tytyl) is a lake of Bilibinsky District, Chukotka Autonomous Okrug, Russia.

Geography
River Tytylvaam flows from it. It is located east of Lake Ilirney, at the feet of the southern slopes of the Ilirney Range, in the upper reaches of the Maly Anyuy River, 55 km from Ilirney village. Its name originated in the Chukchi word for "entrance gate".

See also
List of lakes of Russia

References

Tytyl